Dobrowoda  (Dobryvoda) is a village in the administrative district of Gmina Kleszczele, within Hajnówka County, Podlaskie Voivodeship, in north-eastern Poland, close to the border with Belarus.

According to the 1921 census, the village was inhabited by 297 people, among whom 1 were Roman Catholic, 293 Orthodox, and 3 Mosaic. At the same time, 296 inhabitants declared Polish nationality, 1 Belarusian. There were 70 residential buildings in the village.

References

Villages in Hajnówka County